Heart of Africa is a 1985 video game for the Commodore 64.

Heart of Africa may also refer to:

Heart of Africa (award), a former name for the Africa Movie Academy Award for Best Nigerian Film
Heart of Africa Mission, now WEC International, an interdenominational mission agency
The Heart of Africa, a 1967 film by Solomon Efimovich Shulman
The Heart of Africa, an 1973 book by Georg August Schweinfurth
Heart of Africa, a 2020 film by Tshoper Kabambi

Zoo exhibits
Heart of Africa, a shelved biodome project at the Chester Zoo, Cheshire, England
Heart of Africa, Columbus Zoo and Aquarium, Ohio, US
Heart of Africa, Marwell Zoo, Hampshire, England
Heart of Africa, now the African Woods and African Outpost, San Diego Zoo Safari Park, California, US

See also
Into the Heart of Africa, a 1989 exhibit at the Royal Ontario Museum